James Hilton may refer to:

 James Hilton (academic administrator) (born 1959), Vice Provost and University Librarian & Dean of Libraries at the University of Michigan
 James Hilton (designer) (born 1973), English designer
 James Hilton (novelist) (1900–1954), English novelist
 Jimmy Hilton (1883–1943), English rugby league footballer of the 1900s and 1910s
 James L. Hilton (born 1957), astronomer